Nidubrolu railway station (station code:NDO) is an Indian Railways station in Nidubrolu of Andhra Pradesh. It lies on the Tenali–Gudur section of Indian Railways and is administered under Vijayawada railway division of South Central Railway zone.

Classification 
In terms of earnings and outward passengers handled, Nidubrolu is categorized as a Non-Suburban Grade-5 (NSG-5) railway station. Based on the re–categorization of Indian Railway stations for the period of 2017–18 and 2022–23, an NSG–5 category station earns between – crore and handles  passengers.

Development 
In 2017 SCR installed Automatic Ticket Vending Machines (ATVM)s in this station.

References 

Railway stations in Guntur district
Vijayawada railway division